The Trinidad Chronicle-News is a daily newspaper in Trinidad, Colorado, United States covering local news, sports, business and community events. It was created by a merger in 1898, and it covers southeastern Colorado and northeastern New Mexico, and is published Monday through Friday. It was acquired by CherryRoad Media in December 2021, and has an estimated circulation of 3,500.

 and, a competitor the next year? The editor in 1934 was F. E. Winson.

The paper had the first female sports editor in the United States.

External Links 
 Trinidad Chronicle-News website

References 

Newspapers published in Colorado
Las Animas County, Colorado